Paralympic athletics at the 2018 Asian Para Games was held in Jakarta between 8 and 12 October 2018.

Medal table
Medal for women’s Long Jump T45/46/47 were revised due to doping violation.

Medalists
Athletes listed in pink were classified but no medal were awarded due to limited number of contestants in the event.

Men

Women

Mixed

See also
Athletics at the 2017 ASEAN Para Games
Athletics at the 2018 Asian Games

References

External links
 Athletics - Asian Para Games 2018
 RESULT SYSTEM - ASIAN PARA GAMES JAKARTA 2018
 Medal audit

2018 Asian Para Games events